VIVO! Bratislava (until 7 November 2019 Polus City Center) is a shopping mall in Bratislava, Slovakia. When it opened in November 2000, it was the country's first modern shopping mall.

Part of the complex are two high-rise office towers: "Millennium Tower I" and "Millennium Tower II". Construction of a third tower, "Millennium III", is planned.

References 

Shopping malls in Bratislava